The 2020-21 season is Gokulam Kerala's fourth season since its establishment in 2017 and their fourth season in the I-League.In addition to the i league Gokulam Kerala will also participates in the Super Cup, Durand Cup and IFA Shield

Squad information

First-team squad

Other contracts

Transfers and loans

Transfers in

Transfers Out

Pre-season

Competitions

Overview

I-league

League table 

Due to COVID-19 pandemic, this season's league format was shortened. All teams will face each other once in the first leg of the league, then they will be divided into two different groups. According to points table from first leg, top six teams will face each other once again in the Championship stage, where the team with maximum points (cumulative points collected from all fifteen matches) will be declared the winner of the league and qualify for the 2022 AFC Cup group stage. Whereas the other five teams will play against each other in a Relegation stage where the team with the lowest points (cumulative points collected from all fourteen matches) will be relegated to the 2nd Division League.

Result summary

Results by round

Matches

Second phase

Championship Stage (Group A)

Results by round

Matches

IFA Shield

Group stage

Group D

Quarter-finals

Current technical staff

Statistics 
As of 19 February 2021.

Squad appearances

Goal Scorers

Clean sheets

References

Gokulam
Gokulam Kerala FC seasons